The Nevada Library Association (NLA) is a professional organization for Nevada's librarians and library workers. It is headquartered in Henderson, Nevada. It was founded on June 4, 1946, in Reno, Nevada, the last state in the United States to form a state library association. State Librarian Charles Marriage was one of its chief co-founders and its first president was Edward Castagna. It became an official non-profit organization by statute in 1963 and then reorganized as private, non-profit corporation in 1993. NLA has been directly connected with every piece of library legislation passed by the Nevada State Legislature.

References

External links
 Nevada Library Association website
 Mountain Plains Library Association website

Library associations in the United States
Organizations based in Nevada